Đặng Dung (Chữ Hán: 鄧容, 1373 - 1414) was the poet and general of the later Tran Dynasty in Vietnamese history.

Biography 
Đặng Dung was born in Ta Ha Commune, Thien Loc District, Nghe An (now Can Loc District, Ha Tinh Province). He was the eldest son of Dang Tat.

Under the Ho dynasty, Đặng Dung helped his father govern Thuận Hóa. After the Ming army occupy the country (the country's name at the time was Đại Ngu), the Hồ Dynasty collapsed, Đặng Dung and his father participated in the insurrection of Trần Ngỗi, also known as Giản Định Đế.

In 1409, after the war at Bô Cô (Hiếu Cổ commune, Ý Yên district, Nam Định Province today); Because emperor Giản Định trusted the words of eunuchs Nguyễn Quỹ and Nguyễn Mộng Trang, who said Đặng Tất was an autocrat, Đặng Tất and Nguyễn Cảnh Chân were executed. Angered, Đặng Dung left Trần Ngỗi, together with Nguyễn Cảnh Di (son of Nguyễn Cảnh Chân), brought the Thuận Hóa troops to Thanh Hóa, and Trần Quý Khoáng was crowned emperor.

In 1413, after the Ming took the initiative to attack Thanh Hóa and Nghệ An. Both Giản Định and Trần Quý Khoáng' troops retreated to the mountains and forests. Eventually, Trần Quý Khoáng was captured together with his whole clan in 1413. Alongside with Trần Quý Khoáng, Đặng Dung also committed suicide.

References

Trần dynasty generals
Vietnamese male poets
1414 deaths
1373 births
15th-century Vietnamese poets
14th-century Vietnamese people